In mathematics, a probability measure is a real-valued function defined on a set of events in a probability space that satisfies measure properties such as countable additivity.  The difference between a probability measure and the more general notion of measure (which includes concepts like area or volume) is that a probability measure must assign value 1 to the entire probability space.

Intuitively, the additivity property says that the probability assigned to the union of two disjoint events by the measure should be the sum of the probabilities of the events; for example, the value assigned to "1 or 2" in a throw of a dice should be the sum of the values assigned to "1" and "2".

Probability measures have applications in diverse fields, from physics to finance and biology.

Definition

The requirements for a set function  to be a probability measure on a probability space are that:

  must satisfy the countable additivity property that for all countable collections  of pairwise disjoint sets: 

The conditional probability based on the intersection of events defined as:

Example applications

Market measures which assign probabilities to financial market spaces based on actual market movements are examples of probability measures which are of interest in mathematical finance; for example, in the pricing of financial derivatives. For instance, a risk-neutral measure is a probability measure which assumes that the current value of assets is the expected value of the future payoff taken with respect to that same risk neutral measure (i.e. calculated using the corresponding risk neutral density function), and  discounted at the risk-free rate. If there is a unique probability measure that must be used to price assets in a market, then the market is called a complete market.

Not all measures that intuitively represent chance or likelihood are probability measures. For instance, although the fundamental concept of a system in statistical mechanics is a measure space, such measures are not always probability measures. In general, in statistical physics, if we consider sentences of the form "the probability of a system S assuming state A is p" the geometry of the system does not always lead to the definition of a probability measure under congruence, although it may do so in the case of systems with just one degree of freedom.

Probability measures are also used in mathematical biology. For instance, in comparative sequence analysis a probability measure may be defined for the likelihood that a variant may be permissible for an amino acid in a sequence.

Ultrafilters can be understood as -valued probability measures, allowing for many intuitive proofs based upon measures. For instance, Hindman's Theorem can be proven from the further investigation of these measures, and their convolution in particular.

See also

References

Further reading

External links
 

Experiment (probability theory)
Measures (measure theory)

pl:Miara probabilistyczna